Jan van Dommelen (28 April 1878 – 26 October 1942) was a Dutch film actor of the silent era. He appeared in 44 films between 1911 and 1939.

Filmography

 Boefje (1939)
 De Big van het Regiment (1935)
 De Familie van mijn Vrouw (1935)
 Moderne landhaaien (1926)
 Bleeke Bet (1923)
 Bulldog Drummond (1922)
 De leugen van Pierrot (1922)
 Rechten der jeugd (1921)
 Schakels (1920)
 Een Carmen van het Noorden (1919)
 Het goudvischje (1919)
 Amerikaansche meisjes (1918)
 Oorlog en vrede - 1918 (1918)
 Op hoop van zegen (1918)
 Oorlog en vrede - 1916 (1918)
 Oorlog en vrede - 1914 (1918)
 Toen 't licht verdween (1918)
 De kroon der schande (1918)
 Ulbo Garvema (1917)
 Gouden ketenen (1917)
 Madame Pinkette & Co (1917)
 Het geheim van Delft (1917)
 La renzoni (1916)
 Majoor Frans (1916)
 Het geheim van den vuurtoren (1916)
 Liefdesstrijd (1915)
 Ontmaskerd (1915)
 De vrouw Clasina (1915)
 Het geheim van het slot arco (1915)
 De vloek van het testament (1915)
 Toffe jongens onder de mobilisatie (1914)
 Luchtkastelen (1914)
 Weergevonden (1914)
 Heilig recht (1914)
 De bloemen, die de ziel vertroosten (1914)
 Liefde waakt (1914)
 Zijn viool (1914)
 Krates (1913)
 Silvia Silombra (1913)
 Nederland en Oranje (1913)
 Roze Kate (1912)
 Vrouwenoogen (1912)
 De bannelingen (1911)
 Ontrouw (1911)

External links

1878 births
1942 deaths
Dutch male film actors
Dutch male silent film actors
Dutch film directors
Male actors from Amsterdam
20th-century Dutch male actors